Sweet Vengeance may refer to:

Sweet Vengeance (album), 2003 album by Nightrage
Sweetwater (2013 film), also known as Sweet Vengeance
Sweet Vengeance mine, California